Yash Rohan is a Bangladeshi actor, model and director. his notable works are Swapnajaal, Networker Baire, Poran. He has tremendous fascination towards physics and wanted to be a physicist in his childhood. Nowadays he is a popular face in all types of entertainment platforms.

Family
Yash Rohan's father Naresh Bhuiyan and mother Shilpi Sarkar Apu belong to entertainment arena of Bangladesh.

Career on Screens
Before entering into silver screen, Yash Rohan directed a short film in 2015 named Doob and he also acted in this short film. He directed another short film in 2016 named The Red Note. He made his debut on silver screen with Swapnajaal on 6 April 2018. Then he acted in Iti, Tomari Dhaka where he made a guest appearance. After that, his web film Rupkotha was released in 2018.

In February 2019, his short films Tea Stall and Kintu, Jodi Emon Hoto were released. Then, his web series Gone Case was released. After that his film Mayaboti was released on 13 September 2019. Besides acting on films he acted on television dramas and telefilms too.

Selected TV dramas and telefilms

 Agontuk
 Amader Somajbiggan

 Beder Meye
 Bhoot Hoite Sabdhan
 Bibaho Bivrat
 Chaka
 Dream And Love
 Facebook Chharar Chhoyti Upay
 Kangkhito Prohor
 Kham Vorti Mon
 Miss Shiuli
 Porir Sathe Biye
 Roder Vitor Raat
 Rong Berong
 Sajano Bonobas
 Sukh
 Untold Love Story

Filmography

Flim

Web series

Short film

References

External links
 

Living people
Male actors in Bengali cinema
Bangladeshi male models
Bangladeshi male television actors
Bangladeshi male film actors
Bengali television actors
Bangladeshi directors
Year of birth missing (living people)